La Salle College High School is a Catholic, college preparatory school for boys located in Wyndmoor, a community in Springfield Township, Montgomery County, Pennsylvania, United States, outside Philadelphia, but within the Roman Catholic Archdiocese of Philadelphia. The school is staffed by a lay faculty and the Christian Brothers. Its sports teams compete in the Philadelphia Catholic League and now also participate in the PIAA.

History
La Salle was founded in 1858 as St. Michael's School at Second and Jefferson Streets. It then became the Christian Brothers Academy. In 1863 it became the preparatory school to La Salle College (now La Salle University). The prep school and college shared the same campus up until the 1960s. In 1982 they formally became two separate institutions.

Notable alumni
J. Burrwood Daly (1890) US Congressman
Gus Cifelli (1943) Michigan district court judge and NFL offensive tackle
Paul Arizin (1946) member of Basketball Hall of Fame
Jim Phelan (1947) member of College Basketball Hall of Fame
Dick Bedesem (1949) College football coach
Tom Gola (1951) |member of Basketball Hall of Fame
John Lehman, Jr. (1960) |Secretary of the Navy (1981–87) and member of 9/11 Commission
Chris Matthews (1963) television commentator on Hardball, syndicated columnist
Michael McGinniss (1965) president of La Salle University
Chuck Zapiec	 (1967) PA Sports Hall of Fame, Penn State All-American linebacker, pro football player
Leonard Bosack	 (1969) founder of Cisco Systems
Jack Bauerle (1970) U.S. Olympic and University of Georgia women's swim coach
Brig. Gen. Joseph J. McMenamin	(1970) Assistant Division Commander, 2nd Marine Division
Steve Javie (1972) NBA referee
Joe Mihalich (1974) Head Coach, Hofstra Men's Basketball
George T. Kenney (1975) former member of Pennsylvania House of Representatives from the 170th district
Joe Webster (1976) Member of Pennsylvania House of Representatives from 150th district
Fran McCaffery (1977) Head Coach, Iowa Hawkeyes men's basketball team 
John Waldron (1977) |American criminal defense lawyer
John Schmitt (1980) senior economist, Center for Economic and Policy Research
Hugh Panaro (1982) Broadway actor, Les Misérables, The Phantom of The Opera
Michael J. Stack III (1982) Former Lieutenant Governor of Pennsylvania
George Winslow (1982) Professional football punter
Jim Poole (1984) relief pitcher for Philadelphia Phillies
Tom Gizzi (1985) football player
Charles McIlhinney (1985) Pennsylvania State Senator
John Butler (1991) Defensive backs coach for the Buffalo Bills
Sean McDermott (1993) head coach of NFL's Buffalo Bills
Gregory Michael Hosmer (1999) actor, As the World Turns, Greek, How I Met Your Mother
Anthony Green (2001) Musician, Circa Survive
Tucker Durkin (2009) professional lacrosse player
Joe McKeehen (2009) 2015 World Series of Poker Main Event winner 
Tyler Nase	(2009) Olympic Rower 
Darius Madison	(2012) |Professional Soccer Player 
Matt Rambo (2013) Professional lacrosse player, recipient of the 2017 Tewaaraton Award 
Ryan Winslow (2013) Professional football punter
Zaire Franklin (2014) Linebacker for the Indianapolis Colts 
Kyle Shurmur (2015) Professional football quarterback (Kansas City Chiefs) 
Jimmy Morrissey (2016) Professional football player

Source:

References

Boys' schools in the United States
Catholic secondary schools in Pennsylvania
Lasallian schools in the United States
Educational institutions established in 1858
Schools in Montgomery County, Pennsylvania
1858 establishments in Pennsylvania